Nicola "Nicky" Pietrangeli (born 11 September 1933) is a former Italian tennis player. He won two singles titles at the French Championships and is considered by many to be Italy's greatest tennis champion.

Biography
Born 11 September 1933, in Tunis, Tunisia, Pietrangeli made his international debut at the 1952 Italian Open, losing in fours sets to Jacques Peten. He appeared in four men's singles finals at Roland Garros – winning the title in 1959 and 1960, and finishing runner-up in 1961 and 1964. He also won the Roland Garros men's doubles title in 1959 (together with Orlando Sirola), and the mixed doubles in 1958. At Wimbledon, Pietrangeli was a single semifinalist in 1960, when he lost to Rod Laver in 5 sets. He won the Italian Open in 1957 and 1961 and was ranked World No. 3 by Lance Tingay of The Daily Telegraph in 1959 and 1960 and also by Ned Potter in 1961.

Pietrangeli represented Italy in the Davis Cup between 1954 and 1972. He played in a record 164 Davis Cup rubbers, winning a record 120. He was a player on the Italian teams which reached the Davis Cup final in 1960 and 1961. Both finals were played on grass courts in Australia, and the Italians were not able to overcome the strong Australian team which included Laver, Roy Emerson and Neale Fraser.

After retiring as a player, Pietrangeli became Italy's Davis Cup team captain and guided them to winning their first-ever Davis Cup in 1976.

Pietrangeli was inducted in the International Tennis Hall of Fame in 1986. On his 73rd birthday, the old tennis stadium in Foro Italico of Rome was named in his honour; he is among the very few tennis players to have received such an honour while still living (others include Laver and Margaret Court). He also played a supporting role in the movie There Was a Castle with Forty Dogs in 1990.

Personal life
He had a relationship with the Italian journalist Licia Colò, 30 years younger than him. He's an Eastern Orthodox Christian.

Grand Slam finals

Singles (2 titles, 2 runners-up)

Doubles (1 title, 2 runners-up)

Mixed doubles (1 title)

Performance timeline

See also
 Walk of Fame of Italian sport

References

External links 
 
 
 
 
 

Italian male tennis players
Eastern Orthodox Christians from Italy
Sportspeople from Tunis
International Tennis Hall of Fame inductees
French Championships (tennis) champions
1933 births
Living people
Grand Slam (tennis) champions in men's singles
Grand Slam (tennis) champions in mixed doubles
Grand Slam (tennis) champions in men's doubles
Tennis players at the 1968 Summer Olympics
Mediterranean Games gold medalists for Italy
Mediterranean Games bronze medalists for Italy
Competitors at the 1963 Mediterranean Games
Mediterranean Games medalists in tennis